Tephromela atra is a species of lichen in the family Tephromelataceae. It has a worldwide distribution.

Synonyms
Tephromela atra has many synonym since many previously described species have been reclassified as T. atra. These include Lecanora atra, Lecidea atroides, Lichen ater, Parmelia atra, Patellaria atra, Psora atra, Rinodina atra, Scutellaria atra and Verrucaria atra.

References

Lecanorales
Lichen species
Lichens of Malesia
Lichens described in 1762
Taxa named by William Hudson (botanist)